Arap Islet is an uninhabited island of Turkey. According to Turkish Atlas it is situated on the borderline of Aegean Sea and the Mediterranean Sea. It is very close to the mainland (Anatolia).

References

Islands of Turkey
Islands of Muğla Province
Marmaris District